Peter Philip James Kean (February 27, 1788 – October 2, 1828) was an American soldier and member of the Kean political family.

Early life
Peter Philip James Kean was born in Elizabethtown, New Jersey on February 27, 1788.  He was the only child born of John Kean, the cashier of the Bank of the United States and a Continental Congressmen, and Susan (née Livingston) Kean (1759–1853). After his father's early death in 1795, his mother hired Count Julian Niemcewicz as his tutor.  Niemcewicz, a Polish nobleman who fled Poland after fighting unsuccessfully for Polish independence, later married Kean's mother in 1800.

His paternal grandmother was Jane Grove and his step-grandfather was Captain Samuel Grove, a wealthy and successful merchant from Beaufort County, South Carolina.  His maternal grandparents were Peter Van Brugh Livingston, the New York State Treasurer, and Mary (née Alexander) Livingston.  He was also the great-grandson of Philip Livingston, the 2nd Lord of Livingston Manor, and the great-nephew of New Jersey's governor William Livingston, a signer of the U.S. Declaration of Independence and the U.S. Constitution.

Career

Kean graduated from Princeton University in 1807.  After his graduation, Kean assumed a prominent role in the military affairs of the State of New Jersey.  In 1811, Kean purchased the large estate built by his mother's uncle, known as Liberty Hall, in trust for his mother.

In 1824, when the Marquis de Lafayette returned to the United States for his grand tour, Isaac Halstead Williamson, the 8th New Jersey Governor, appointed Kean to the reception committee to welcome him due to Kean's prominence and fluency in French.

At the time of his death, Kean was Colonel of the Fourth Regiment of the State of New Jersey.

Personal life
On February 18, 1813, Kean was married to Sarah Sabina Morris (1788–1878), the daughter of General Jacob Morris and Mary (née Cox) Morris.  Sarah was a granddaughter of Lewis Morris, a signor of the Declaration of Independence.  Together, they were the parents of:

 John Kean (1814–1895), who married Lucinetta "Lucy" Halsted (1825–1912), daughter of Caleb Halstead, Esq., a merchant, and had ten children.
 Jacob Morris Kean (1815–1817), who died young.
 Julia Ursin Niemcewiez Kean (1816–1887), who married Hamilton Fish (1808–1893), a descendant of Peter Stuyvesant, in 1836 and had eight children. Fish served as Governor of New York, U.S. Senator, and U.S. Secretary of State.
 Sarah Louisa Jay Kean (1818–1828), who died young.
 Susan Mary Kean (1821–1824), who died young.
 Helen Rutherfurd Kean (1822–1824), who died young.
 Christine Alexander William Kean (1826–1915), who married William Preston Griffin (1810–1851), a cousin of William Radford.
 Cornelia Livingston Kean (1829–1829), who died young.

Kean died on October 2, 1828 in New Lebanon, New York.

Descendants
Through his daughter Julia, he was the grandfather of Julia Kean Fish (1841–1908), who married Samuel Nicholl Benjamin (1839–1886), a Union Army officer; Nicholas Fish II (1848–1902), who served as U.S. Ambassador to Switzerland and Belgium; Hamilton Fish II (1849–1936), a U.S. Representative and Speaker of the New York State Assembly;  and Stuyvesant Fish (1851–1923), a president of the Illinois Central Railroad who married Marion Graves Anthon (1853–1915), a leader of New York Society during the Gilded Age.

Through his son John, he was the grandfather of John Kean (1852–1914) and Hamilton Fish Kean (1862–1941), both of whom would later serve as U.S. Senators for New Jersey.

References

External links
 

1788 births
1828 deaths
Princeton University alumni
Peter Philip James
Peter Philip James Kean
Burials at St. Peter's churchyard, Philadelphia